Persica may refer to:

Persica (Ctesias), a lost ancient Greek text
Persica (subgenus), a subgenus of Prunus